Luodong Sports Park is a park in Luodong Township, Yilan County, Taiwan.

Architecture
The park covers 47 hectares of land and it includes a range of facilities for sport including basketball and a swimming pool. The park is divided into four sections that include: forest area, sport area, waterscapes, and other landscapes.

Transportation
The park is accessible from Luodong Station of the Taiwan Railways Administration by heading west along Gongzheng Road for 2.2 kilometers.

See also
 List of parks in Taiwan

References

Geography of Yilan County, Taiwan
Parks in Yilan County